Sapphawitthayakhom School is a public school located in Mae Sot, Thailand. It admits secondary students (mathayom 1–6, equivalent to grades 7–12)). The school was founded on 30 November 1915. The student population is 2,500, with 120 staff, 97 of whom are teaching staff.

Programs 
In upper-secondary there are six majors:
 Intensive Science Math (ISM)
 Science Math and Technology (SMAT)
 Mini English Program (MEP)
 Multi language Program (MP)
 Arts - Chinese
 Arts - Burmese

International school standards
Sapphawitthayakhom school has run an international  curriculum from grade 7 through grade 9 since 2010. In May 2012, Sapphawitthayakhom the school introduced a Mini English Program from Grade 7 through grade 10. All subjects are taught in English except Thai, Burmese and Chinese. The major English Subjects are: Computer, Physics, Core Maths, Biology, Chemistry, Astronomy, Social Studies, Health & Physical Education, Add Maths, Occupation & Technology.

Schools in Thailand
Buildings and structures in Tak province
Educational institutions established in 1915
1915 establishments in Siam